The canton of Barentin is an administrative division of the Seine-Maritime department, in northern France. It was created at the French canton reorganisation which came into effect in March 2015. Its seat is in Barentin.

Composition 

It consists of the following communes:

Anneville-Ambourville
Bardouville
Barentin
Berville-sur-Seine
Blacqueville
Bouville
Duclair
Épinay-sur-Duclair
Hénouville
Jumièges
Mauny
Le Mesnil-sous-Jumièges
Quevillon
Saint-Martin-de-Boscherville
Saint-Paër
Saint-Pierre-de-Varengeville
Sainte-Marguerite-sur-Duclair
Le Trait
Villers-Écalles
Yainville
Yville-sur-Seine

Councillors

Pictures of the canton

References 

Cantons of Seine-Maritime